Glenn Michael Sparkman (born May 11, 1992) is an American professional baseball pitcher who is currently a free agent. He previously played in Major League Baseball (MLB) for the Toronto Blue Jays and Kansas City Royals, and in Nippon Professional Baseball (NPB) for the Orix Buffaloes.

High school and college
Sparkman attended Ganado High School in his hometown of Ganado, Texas. Undrafted out of high school, he attended Wharton County Junior College in Wharton, Texas. In 2013, his junior year, he went 5-4 with a 2.78 ERA in 77.2 innings.

Professional career

Kansas City Royals
Sparkman was selected by the Kansas City Royals in the 20th round of the 2013 Major League Baseball draft. He was assigned to the Rookie Idaho Falls Chukars for the 2013 season and made 20 relief appearances, posting a 1–0 win–loss record, 1.72 earned run average (ERA), and 47 strikeouts in 36 innings pitched. Sparkman was promoted to the Advanced-A Wilmington Blue Rocks of the Carolina League for the 2014 season. He was named the Carolina League's Pitcher of the Year after pitching to an 8–3 record, 1.56 ERA, and 117 strikeouts in 121 innings pitched. 

Sparkman began the 2015 season with the Double-A Northwest Arkansas Naturals, making four starts and going 2–2 with a 3.60 ERA before going on the disabled list with an arm injury. It was later determined that he needed Tommy John surgery, which caused him to miss the remainder of the season and the start of the 2016 season. Sparkman rehabbed with the Arizona League Royals, and also made starts for the Class-A Lexington Legends, Advanced-A Wilmington, and Double-A Northwest Arkansas in 2016. In 16 combined starts, he posted a 2–7 record, 5.22 ERA, and 65 strikeouts in 60 innings.

Toronto Blue Jays

On December 8, 2016, Sparkman was selected by the Toronto Blue Jays in the 2016 Rule 5 draft.  Sparkman suffered a broken right thumb in spring training in 2017, and opened the season on the 10-day disabled list. On April 10, he was transferred to the 60-day disabled list. Sparkman was activated on June 30 and called up by the Blue Jays. He appeared in relief in two games, giving up seven runs over a single inning pitched. He was designated for assignment on July 3.

Kansas City Royals (second stint)
On July 8, 2017, Sparkman was returned to the Royals organization. He finished the year with the Double-A Northwest Arkansas Naturals, posting a 2.61 ERA in 3 appearances. He was assigned to Northwest Arkansas to begin the 2018 season, later receiving a promotion to the Triple-A Omaha Storm Chasers. Sparkman was added to the Royals active roster on July 8, 2018. In 15 games on the year, Sparkman recorded an 0-3 record and 4.46 ERA. 

Sparkman pitched in 31 games for the Royals in 2019, posting a 4-11 record and 6.02 ERA with 81 strikeouts in 136.0 innings of work. With the 2020 Kansas City Royals, Sparkman appeared in 4 games, compiling a 0-0 record with 5.40 ERA and 2 strikeouts in 5.0 innings pitched. On November 20, 2020, Sparkman was designated for assignment. On November 23, the Royals released Sparkman.

Minnesota Twins
On December 17, 2020, Sparkman signed a minor league contract with the Minnesota Twins organization. Sparkman pitched three innings of one-run ball for the Triple-A St. Paul Saints before being released on May 18, 2021.

Orix Buffaloes
On June 23, 2021, Sparkman signed with the Orix Buffaloes of Nippon Professional Baseball (NPB). On August 18, he made his debut at NPB as a starter against the Hokkaido Nippon-Ham Fighters.
Sparkman pitched 17 innings for the Buffaloes, posting an 0-1 record with a 6.88 ERA and 14 strikeouts. He became a free agent following the 2021 season.

Lotte Giants
On December 12, 2021, Sparkman signed with the Lotte Giants of the KBO League. He was released on August 2, 2022.

References

External links

 Career statistics - NPB.jp
 56 グレン・スパークマン 選手名鑑2021 - Orix Buffaloes  Official site 

1992 births
Living people
American expatriate baseball players in Canada
Arizona League Royals players
Baseball players from Texas
Buffalo Bisons (minor league) players
Dunedin Blue Jays players
Idaho Falls Chukars players
Kansas City Royals players
Lexington Legends players
Major League Baseball pitchers
New Hampshire Fisher Cats players
Northwest Arkansas Naturals players
Omaha Storm Chasers players
People from Ganado, Texas
Toronto Blue Jays players
Wilmington Blue Rocks players